The South Halmahera–West New Guinea (SHWNG) languages are a branch of the Malayo-Polynesian languages, found in the islands and along the shores of the Halmahera Sea in the Indonesian province of North Maluku and of Cenderawasih Bay in the provinces of Papua and West Papua. There are 38 languages.

The unity of the South Halmahera–West New Guinea subgroup is well supported by lexical and phonological evidence. Blust (1978) has proposed that they are most closely related to the Oceanic languages, but this classification is not universally accepted.

Most of the languages are only known from short word lists, but Buli on Halmahera, and Biak and Waropen in Cenderawasih Bay, are fairly well attested.

Classification
Traditionally, the languages are classified into two geographic groups:
South Halmahera languages (along the southeastern coast of Halmahera, plus one language in the east of the Bomberai Peninsula). 
West New Guinea languages (on the Raja Ampat Islands west of New Guinea, and the islands and shoreline of Cenderawasih Bay). 

The unity of the South Halmahera and Raja Ampat languages is supported by phonological changes noted in Blust (1978) and Remijsen (2002). This results in the following structure:
Cenderawasih Bay
Halmahera Sea (South Halmahera, in the sea between Halmahera and New Guinea, and Raja Ampat off the western tip of New Guinea)

David Kamholz (2014) includes these languages as additional branches:
Lower Mamberamo (sometimes also considered to be Papuan, and may be of mixed Austronesian and Papuan origin)
Mor
Tandia
Waropen

The following languages groups are problematic – they may or may not be SHWNG. Kamholz (2014) does not classify them due to lack of data. Grimes & Edwards include them with the Kei–Tanimbar languages.<ref>Charles Grimes & Owen Edwards (in process) Wallacean subgroups: unravelling the prehistory and classification of the Austronesian languages of eastern Indonesia and Timor-Leste. Summary presentation at the 15th International Conference on Austronesian Linguistics.</ref>
Irarutu–Nabi: Irarutu, Kuri (Nabi)
Bedoanas–Erokwanas: Arguni, Bedoanas, Erokwanas

Kamholz (2014)
The SHWNG languages can be categorized as follows (Kamholz 2014: 136-141):

South Halmahera–West New Guinea (SHWNG)
Tandia
Moor
Waropen
Warembori (sometimes considered non-Austronesian)
Yoke (sometimes considered non-Austronesian)
RASH (Raja Ampat–South Halmahera)
Ambel-Biga
Ma'ya-Matbat
Maden (including the Fiawat dialect)
As
South Halmahera
Southern South Halmahera: Gane, Taba
Central-Eastern South Halmahera: Buli, Maba, Patani, Sawai
Gebe
Cenderawasih Bay
Biakic: Biak, Dusner, Meoswar, Roon
Yapen
Western Yapen: Ambai, Ansus, Marau, Wandamen, Wooi, Central Yapen (Munggui, Papuma, Pom, Serui-Laut)
Eastern Yapen: Kurudu, Wabo
Southwest Cenderawasih Bay
Yaur-Yerisiam
Umar

Kamholz (2014) presumes the homeland of proto-SHWNG to be the southern coast of the Cenderawasih Bay.

Typology
At least six SHWNG languages, namely Ma'ya, Matbat, Ambel, Moor, Yaur, and Yerisiam, are tonal. Klamer, et al. (2008) suggest that tone in these SHWNG languages originated from contact with Papuan languages of the Raja Ampat Islands that are now extinct. There are few lexical similarities with present-day Papuan languages, except for a few words such as 'sago' that are shared with the two tonal Papuan isolates Abun and Mpur (both spoken on the north coast of the Bird's Head Peninsula):biH (Ma'ya)bei (Abun)biL (Mpur)

However, Arnold (2018) traces this etymology to proto-Malayo-Polynesian *Rambia 'sago palm'.

Arnold (2018) reconstructs tone for proto-Ma'ya-Matbat and proto-Ambel, but not for proto-SHWNG. Other than tonogenesis, these proto-languages had also gone through monosyllabization.

The mutation is found in the Ambai, Ansus, Biak, Busami, Dusner, Kurudu, Marau, Meoswar, Moor, Munggui, Papuma, Pom, Roon, Roswar (possibly equivalent to Meoswar), Serewen (possibly a dialect of Pom), Serui-Laut, Umar, Wamesa, Warembori, Waropen, Wooi, Yaur, Yerisiam, and Yoke languages.

Kamholz notes that SHWNG languages have relatively low lexical retention rates from Proto-Malayo-Polynesian, pointing to significant influence from non-Austronesian languages.

References

Kamholz, David. 2014b. South Halmahera–West New Guinea: The history of Oceanic's closest relative''. LSA Annual Meeting. Minneapolis, MN.

 
Languages of western New Guinea
Cenderawasih Bay
Halmahera